Brittle stars, serpent stars, or ophiuroids (referring to the serpent-like arms of the brittle star) are echinoderms in the class Ophiuroidea, closely related to starfish. They crawl across the sea floor using their flexible arms for locomotion.

The Ophiuroidea contain two large clades, Ophiurida (brittle stars) and Euryalida (basket stars). Over 2,000 species of brittle stars live today. More than 1,200 of these species are found in deep waters, greater than 200 m deep.

Range

The ophiuroids diverged in the Early Ordovician, about 500 million years ago. Ophiuroids can be found today in all of the major marine provinces, from the poles to the tropics. Basket stars are usually confined to the deeper parts of this range; Ophiuroids are known even from abyssal (>6,000 m) depths. However, brittle stars are also common members of reef communities, where they hide under rocks and even within other living organisms. A few ophiuroid species can even tolerate brackish water, an ability otherwise almost unknown among echinoderms. A brittle star's skeleton is made up of embedded ossicles.

Anatomy

Of all echinoderms, the Ophiuroidea may have the strongest tendency toward five-segment radial (pentaradial) symmetry. The body outline is similar to that of starfish, in that ophiuroids have five arms joined to a central body disk. However, in ophiuroids, the central body disk is sharply marked off from the arms.

The disk contains all of the viscera. That is, the internal organs of digestion and reproduction never enter the arms, as they do in the Asteroidea. The underside of the disk contains the mouth, which has five toothed jaws formed from skeletal plates. The madreporite is usually located within one of the jaw plates, and not on the upper side of the animal as it is in starfish.

The ophiuroid coelom is strongly reduced, particularly in comparison to other echinoderms.

Water-vascular system
The vessels of the water vascular system end in tube feet. The water vascular system generally has one madreporite. Others, such as certain Euryalina, have one per arm on the aboral surface.  Still other forms have no madreporite at all. Suckers and ampullae are absent from the tube feet.

Nervous system
The nervous system consists of a main nerve ring which runs around the central disk. At the base of each arm, the ring attaches to a radial nerve which runs to the end of the limb. The nerves in each limb run through a canal at the base of the vertebral ossicles.

Most ophiuroids have no eyes, or other specialised sense organs. However, they have several types of sensitive nerve endings in their epidermis, and are able to sense chemicals in the water, touch, and even the presence or absence of light. Moreover, tube feet may sense light as well as odors.  These are especially found at the ends of their arms, detecting light and retreating into crevices.

Digestion
The mouth is rimmed with five jaws, and serves as an anus (egestion) as well as a mouth (ingestion). Behind the jaws is a short esophagus and a stomach cavity which occupies much of the dorsal half of the disk. Digestion occurs within 10 pouches or infolds of the stomach, which are essentially ceca, but unlike in sea stars, almost never extend into the arms. The stomach wall contains glandular hepatic cells.

Ophiuroids are generally scavengers or detritivores. Small organic particles are moved into the mouth by the tube feet. Ophiuroids may also prey on small crustaceans or worms. Basket stars in particular may be capable of suspension feeding, using the mucus coating on their arms to trap plankton and bacteria. They extend one arm out and use the other four as anchors. Brittle stars will eat small suspended organisms if available. In large, crowded areas, brittle stars eat suspended matter from prevailing seafloor currents.

In basket stars, the arms are used to sweep food rhythmically to the mouth. Pectinura consumes beech pollen in the New Zealand fjords (since those trees hang over the water). Eurylina clings to coral branches to browse on the polyps.

Respiration
Gas exchange and excretion occur through cilia-lined sacs called bursae; each opens between the arm bases on the underside of the disk. Typically ten bursae are found, and each fits between two stomach digestive pouches. Water flows through the bursae by means of cilia or muscular contraction. Oxygen is transported through the body by the hemal system, a series of sinuses and vessels distinct from the water vascular system.

The bursae are probably also the main organs of excretion, with phagocytic "coelomocytes" collecting waste products in the body cavity and then migrating to the bursae for expulsion from the body.

Musculoskeletal system

Like all echinoderms, the Ophiuroidea possess a skeleton of calcium carbonate in the form of calcite.  In ophiuroids, the calcite ossicles are fused to form armor plates which are known collectively as the test. The plates are covered by the epidermis, which consists of a smooth syncytium. In most species, the joints between the ossicles and superficial plates allow the arm to bend to the side, but cannot bend upwards. However, in the basket stars, the arms are flexible in all directions.

Both the Ophiurida and Euryalida (the basket stars) have five long, slender, flexible, whip-like arms, up to 60 cm in length. They are supported by an internal skeleton of calcium carbonate plates referred to as vertebral ossicles. These "vertebrae" articulate by means of ball-and-socket joints, and are controlled by muscles. They are essentially fused plates which correspond to the parallel ambulacral plates in sea stars and five Paleozoic families of ophiuroids.  In modern forms, the vertebrae occur along the median of the arm.

The ossicles are surrounded by a relatively thin ring of soft tissue, and then by four series of jointed plates, one each on the upper, lower, and lateral surfaces of the arm. The two lateral plates often have a number of elongated spines projecting outwards; these help to provide traction against the substrate while the animal is moving. The spines, in ophiuroids, compose a rigid border to the arm edges, whereas in euryalids they are transformed into downward-facing clubs or hooklets.  Euryalids are similar to ophiurids, if larger, but their arms are forked and branched. Ophiuroid podia generally function as sensory organs. They are not usually used for feeding, as in Asteroidea. In the Paleozoic era, brittle stars had open ambulacral grooves, but in modern forms, these are turned inward.

In living ophiuroids, the vertebrae are linked by well-structured longitudinal muscles. Ophiuroida move horizontally, and Euryalina species move vertically. The latter have bigger vertebrae and smaller muscles. They are less spasmodic, but can coil their arms around objects, holding on even after death. These movement patterns are distinct to the taxa, separating them. Ophiuroida move quickly when disturbed. One arm presses ahead, whereas the other four act as two pairs of opposite levers, thrusting the body in a series of rapid jerks. Although adults do not use their tube feet for locomotion, very young stages use them as stilts and even serve as an adhesive structure.

Reproduction
The sexes are separate in most species, though a few are hermaphroditic or protandric. The gonads are located in the disk, and open into pouches between the arms, called genital bursae. Fertilisation is external in most species, with the gametes being shed into the surrounding water through the bursal sacs. An exception is the Ophiocanopidae, in which the gonads do not open into bursae and are instead paired in a chain along the basal arm joints.

Many species brood developing larvae in the bursae, effectively giving birth to live young. A few, such as Amphipholus squamata, are truly viviparous, with the embryo receiving nourishment from the mother through the wall of the bursa. However, some species do not brood their young, and instead have a free-swimming larval stage. Referred to as an ophiopluteus, these larvae have four pairs of rigid arms lined with cilia. They develop directly into an adult, without the attachment stage found in most starfish larvae. The number of species exhibiting ophiopluteus larvae are fewer than those that directly develop.

In a few species, the female carries a dwarf male, clinging to it with the mouth.

Fission
Some brittle stars, such as the six-armed members of the family Ophiactidae, exhibit fissiparity (division through fission), with the disk splitting in half. Regrowth of both the lost part of the disk and the arms occur which yields an animal with three large arms and three small arms during the period of growth.

The West Indian brittle star, Ophiocomella ophiactoides, frequently undergoes asexual reproduction by fission of the disk with subsequent regeneration of the arms. In both summer and winter, large numbers of individuals with three long arms and three short arms can be found. Other individuals have half a disk and only three arms. A study of the age range of the population indicates little recruitment and fission is the primary means of reproduction in this species.

In this species, fission appears to start with the softening of one side of the disk and the initiation of a furrow. This deepens and widens until it extends across the disk and the animal splits in two. New arms begin to grow before the fission is complete, thus minimizing the time between possible successive divisions. The plane of fission varies so that some newly formed individuals have existing arms of different lengths. The time period between successive divisions is 89 days, so theoretically, each brittle star can produce 15 new individuals during the course of a year.

Life span
Brittle stars generally sexually mature in two to three years, become full grown in three to four years, and live up to five years. Members of Euryalina, such as Gorgonocephalus, may live much longer.

Regeneration

Ophiuroids can readily regenerate lost arms or arm segments unless all arms are lost. Ophiuroids use this ability to escape predators, in a way similar to lizards which deliberately shed the distal part of their tails to confuse pursuers.  Moreover, the Amphiuridae can regenerate gut and gonad fragments lost along with the arms.  Discarded arms have not been shown to have the ability to regenerate.

Locomotion
Brittle stars use their arms for locomotion. Brittle stars move fairly rapidly by wriggling their arms which are highly flexible and enable the animals to make either snake-like or rowing movements.  However, they tend to attach themselves to the sea floor or to sponges or cnidarians, such as coral.  
They move as if they were bilaterally symmetrical, with an arbitrary leg selected as the symmetry axis and the other four used in propulsion. The axial leg may be facing or trailing the direction of motion, and due to the radially symmetrical nervous system, can be changed whenever a change in direction is necessary.

Bioluminescence
Over 60 species of brittle stars are known to be bioluminescent. Most of these produce light in the green wavelengths, although a few blue-emitting species have also been discovered. Both shallow-water and deep-sea species of brittle stars are known to produce light. Presumably, this light is used to deter predators.

Ecology
Brittle stars live in areas from the low-tide level downwards.  Six families live at least 2 m deep; the genera Ophiura, Amphiophiura, and Ophiacantha range below 4 m.  Shallow species live among sponges, stones, or coral, or under the sand or mud, with only their arms protruding.  Two of the best-known shallow species are the green brittle star (Ophioderma brevispina), found from Massachusetts to Brazil, and the common European brittle star (Ophiothrix fragilis).  Deep-water species tend to live in or on the sea floor or adhere to coral, urchins, or xenophyophores.  The most widespread species is the long-armed brittle star (Amphipholis squamata), a grayish or bluish, strongly luminescent species.

Parasites
The main parasite to enter the digestive tract or genitals are protozoans. Crustaceans, nematodes, trematodes, and polychaete annelids also serve as parasites.  Algal parasites such as Coccomyxa ophiurae cause spinal malformation.  Unlike in sea stars and sea urchins, annelids are not typical parasites.

Diversity and taxonomy 

This makes brittle stars the most abundant group of current echinoderms (before sea stars). Around 270 genera are known, these are distributed in 16 families, which makes them at the same time a relatively poorly diversified group structurally, compared with the other echinoderms. For example, 467 species belong to the sole family of Amphiuridae (frail brittle stars which live buried in the sediment leaving only their arms in the stream to capture the plankton). There are also 344 species in the family of Ophiuridae.

List of families according to the World Register of Marine Species, following O'Hara 2017:
 subclass Myophiuroidea Matsumoto, 1915
 infra-class Metophiurida Matsumoto, 1913
 super-order Euryophiurida O'Hara, Hugall, Thuy, Stöhr & Martynov, 2017
 order Euryalida Lamarck, 1816
 family Asteronychidae Ljungman, 1867
 family Euryalidae Gray, 1840
 family Gorgonocephalidae Ljungman, 1867
 order Ophiurida Müller & Troschel, 1840 sensu O'Hara et al., 2017
 suborder Ophiomusina O'Hara et al., 2017
 family Ophiomusaidae (O'Hara, Stöhr, Hugall, Thuy, Martynov, 2018)
 family Ophiosphalmidae (O'Hara, Stöhr, Hugall, Thuy & Martynov, 2018)
 Ophiomusina incertae sedis
 suborder Ophiurina Müller & Troschel, 1840 sensu O'Hara et al., 2017
 family Astrophiuridae Sladen, 1879
 family Ophiopyrgidae Perrier, 1893
 family Ophiuridae Müller & Troschel, 1840
 Ophiurina incertae sedis
 Ophiurida incertae sedis
 super-order Ophintegrida O'Hara, Hugall, Thuy, Stöhr & Martynov, 2017
 order Amphilepidida O'Hara, Hugall, Thuy, Stöhr & Martynov, 2017
 suborder Gnathophiurina Matsumoto, 1915 
 super-family Amphiuroidea Ljungman, 1867
 family Amphiuridae Ljungman, 1867
 family Amphilepididae Matsumoto, 1915
 super-family Ophiactoidea Ljungman, 1867
 family Ophiactidae Matsumoto, 1915
 family Ophiopholidae O'Hara, Stöhr, Hugall, Thuy & Martynov, 2018
 family Ophiothamnidae O'Hara, Stöhr, Hugall, Thuy & Martynov, 2018
 family Ophiotrichidae Ljungman, 1867
 suborder Ophionereidina O'Hara, Hugall, Thuy, Stöhr & Martynov, 2017 
 super-family Ophiolepidoidea Ljungman, 1867
 family Hemieuryalidae Verrill, 1899
 family Ophiolepididae Ljungman, 1867 (restricted)
 super-family Ophionereidoidea Ljungman, 1867
 family Amphilimnidae O'Hara, Stöhr, Hugall, Thuy & Martynov, 2018
 family Ophionereididae Ljungman, 1867
 suborder Ophiopsilina Matsumoto, 1915 
 super-family Ophiopsiloidea Matsumoto, 1915
 family Ophiopsilidae Matsumoto, 1915
 order Ophiacanthida O'Hara, Hugall, Thuy, Stöhr & Martynov, 2017
 suborder Ophiacanthina O'Hara, Hugall, Thuy, Stöhr & Martynov, 2017
 family Clarkcomidae O'Hara, Stöhr, Hugall, Thuy & Martynov, 2018
 family Ophiacanthidae Ljungman, 1867
 family Ophiobyrsidae Matsumoto, 1915
 family Ophiocamacidae (O'Hara, Stöhr, Hugall, Thuy, Martynov, 2018)
 family Ophiopteridae O'Hara, Stöhr, Hugall, Thuy & Martynov, 2018
 family Ophiotomidae Paterson, 1985
family Ophiojuridae O'Hara, Thuy & Hugall, 2021
 suborder Ophiodermatina Ljungman, 1867 
 super-family Ophiocomoidea Ljungman, 1867
 family Ophiocomidae Ljungman, 1867
 super-family Ophiodermatoidea Ljungman, 1867
 family Ophiodermatidae Ljungman, 1867
 family Ophiomyxidae Ljungman, 1867
 family Ophiopezidae O'Hara, Stöhr, Hugall, Thuy & Martynov, 2018
 Ophiacanthida incertae sedis
 order Ophioleucida O'Hara, Hugall, Thuy, Stöhr & Martynov, 2017 
 family Ophiernidae O'Hara, Stöhr, Hugall, Thuy & Martynov, 2018
 family Ophioleucidae Matsumoto, 1915
 order Ophioscolecida O'Hara, Hugall, Thuy, Stöhr & Martynov, 2017 
 family Ophiohelidae Perrier, 1893
 family Ophioscolecidae Lütken, 1869
 Ophiuroidea incertae sedis

Fossil record
The first known brittle stars date from Early Ordovician. Study of past distribution and evolution of brittle stars has been hampered by the tendency of dead brittle stars to disarticulate and scatter, providing poor brittle star fossils. Until discoveries in the Agrio Formation of Neuquén Basin in the 2010s no fossil brittle star was known in the Southern Hemisphere, nor was any brittle star of Cretaceous age known.

Human relations

Brittle stars are not used as food, though they are not toxic, because of their strong skeleton.

Even if some species have blunt spines, no brittlestar is known to be dangerous, nor venomous. There is no harm evidence towards humans, and even with their predators, brittlestars' only means of defense is escaping or discarding an arm.

Aquaria
Brittle stars are a moderately popular invertebrate in fishkeeping. They can easily thrive in marine tanks; in fact, the micro brittle star is a common "hitchhiker" that will propagate and become common in almost any saltwater tank, if one happens to come along on some live rock.

Larger brittle stars are popular because, unlike Asteroidea, they are not generally seen as a threat to coral, and are also faster-moving and more active than their more archetypical cousins.

References

 Andrew B. Smith, Howard B. Fell, Daniel B. Blake, Howard B. Fell, "Ophiuroidea", in AccessScience@McGraw-Hill, http://www.accessscience.com, DOI 10.1036/1097-8542.471000
 David L. Pawson, Andrew C. Campbell, David L. Pawson, David L. Pawson, Raymond C. Moore, J. John Sepkoski, Jr., "Echinodermata", in AccessScience@McGraw-Hill, http://www.accessscience.com, DOI 10.1036/1097-8542.210700
 "brittle star."Encyclopædia Britannica. 2008. Encyclopædia Britannica 2006 Ultimate Reference Suite DVD 17 June 2008.
Palaeos: Ophiuroidea
Brittlestars on wetwebmedia.com

Ophiuroidea
Articles containing video clips
Extant Ordovician first appearances